Prostanthera eungella is a species of flowering plant in the family Lamiaceae and is endemic to the Eungella region in Queensland. It is an erect shrub with narrow egg-shaped leaves with small teeth, and mauve flowers that are white inside the petal tube and arranged in upper leaf axils.

Description
Flowering has been recorded in May and December.

Taxonomy
Prostanthera eungella was first formally described in 2016 by Barry Conn and Kirstin M. Proft in the journal Telopea from specimens collected north-west of Eungella township.

Distribution and habitat
This mintbush is only known from near the type location where it grows in open forest and on the edge of rainforest.

Conservation status
Prostanthera eungella is classified as of "least concern" under the Queensland Government Nature Conservation Act 1992.

References

eungella
Flora of Queensland
Lamiales of Australia
Taxa named by Barry John Conn
Plants described in 2016